Events from the year 1993 in Taiwan. This year is numbered Minguo 82 according to the official Republic of China calendar.

Incumbents
 President – Lee Teng-hui
 Vice President – Lien Chan
 Premier – Hau Pei-tsun, Lien Chan
 Vice Premier – Shih Chi-yang, Hsu Li-teh

Events

March
 7 March – The establishment of Civil Party.

September
 28 September – The launch of TVBS.

October
 15 October – The establishment of Council of Asian Liberals and Democrats in Taipei.
 16 October – The inauguration of Institute of Yilan County History in Yilan County.

Births
 3 January – Candy Chen, dancer, actress, host, singer and model
 24 February – Shuai Pei-ling, badminton player
 12 May – Ming Jie, actor and singer
 20 May – Lin Shih-chia, archer
 30 June – Lin Chia-yu, badminton player
 1 August – Chen Szu-yu, table tennis player
 12 August – Hannah Quinlivan, actress and model
 29 August – Oceana Wu, actress
 19 September – Chan Hao-ching, tennis player
 26 September – Huang Wei-chieh, baseball player
 7 November – Tan Ya-ting, archer

Deaths
 11 May – Chen Chi-chuan, Mayor of Kaohsiung (1960–1968)
 24 December – Yen Chia-kan, President of the Republic of China (1975–1978)

References

 
Years of the 20th century in Taiwan